The name Tonyo has been used in the Philippines by PAGASA in the Western Pacific.
 Typhoon Nock-ten (2004) (T0424, 28W, Tonyo) –  struck Taiwan.
 Tropical Storm Noul (2008) (T0821, 26W, Tonyo) – struck Vietnam.
 Tropical Storm Etau (2020) (T2021, 24W, Tonyo) – struck the Philippines and Vietnam.

Pacific typhoon set index articles